Michael Power may refer to:

People
Michael Power (athlete) (born 1976), Australian former long-distance runner
Michael Power (Australian politician) (died 1880), Australian politician
Michael Power (bishop) (1804–1847), Canadian bishop
Michael Joseph Power (1834–1895), businessman and political figure in Nova Scotia, Canada
Michael Power (accountant) (born 1957), professor of accounting

Other uses
Michael Power (character), an advertising character for Guinness
Michael Power/St. Joseph High School, a secondary school in Toronto, Canada

Power, Michael